Elysian Park is a neighborhood in Central Los Angeles, California. It is a predominantly low-income community, and has a population of more than 2,600 people. The city park, Elysian Park, and Dodger Stadium are within the neighborhood, as are an all-boys Catholic high school and an elementary school.

History

On August 2, 1769, the Portolá expedition (the first Europeans to see inland areas of California) camped close to the Los Angeles River near what is now the southeastern corner of the city park. California Historical Landmark #655 (Portolá Trail Campsite) is at the park's Meadow Road entrance.

Geography

According to the Mapping L.A. project of the Los Angeles Times, the Elysian Park neighborhood is flanked on the north and northeast by Elysian Valley, on the east by Lincoln Heights, on the southeast and south by Chinatown and on the southwest, west and northwest by Echo Park. Street and other boundaries are: the northern apex at Exit 138 of the Golden State Freeway, thence southeasterly along the freeway, southerly along the Los Angeles River, westerly along North Broadway, northwesterly along Stadium Way, Academy Road and northerly along Elysian Park Drive.

Demographics 

The 2000 U.S. census of the Elysian Park neighborhood counted 2,530 residents in its 1.65 square miles, which includes all the city park land as well as Dodger Stadium—an average of 1,538 people per square mile, one of the lowest population densities in Los Angeles county. In 2008 the city estimated that the population had increased to 2,659. The median age for residents was 31, about average for Los Angeles; the percentage of residents aged 11 to 18 were among the county's highest.

The neighborhood was moderately ethnically diverse. The breakdown was Latinos, 47.6%; Asians, 43.4%; whites, 3.1%; blacks, 2.1%, and others, 3.7%. China (32.3%) and Mexico (27.3%) were the most common places of birth for the 54.4% of the residents who were born abroad, a high figure compared to rest of the city.

The median yearly household income in 2008 dollars was $28,263, low for Los Angeles; a high percentage of households had an income of $20,000 or less. The average household size of 3.1 people was high for the city of Los Angeles. Renters occupied 81.9% of the housing stock, and house- or apartment owners 18.1%.

Education
Thirteen percent of the neighborhood residents aged 25 and older had earned a four-year degree by 2000, an average figure for the city.

The schools operating within the Elysian Park neighborhood borders are:

 Cathedral High School, private, 1253 Bishops Road. It was founded by Archbishop John Joseph Cantwell as the first Los Angeles Archdiocesan high school for boys in fall 1925. The Christian Brothers have operated the school since its opening. It was designated Los Angeles Historic-Cultural Monument number 281 in 1984.
 Solano Avenue Elementary School, LAUSD, 615 Solano Avenue. In 1955, the school, which then had 230 pupils, was honored as one of the 221 schools given a California Distinguished School award. The Los Angeles Times reported that:

At Solano Avenue Elementary School, things are done right. Parents chip in, teachers stick around for years, children learn, and the surrounding community claims it for their own. The campus is a thing of pride-no graffiti or trash problems here.
Principal John Stoll noted that nearly half the children began school speaking limited English, having been raised in Spanish or Cantonese-speaking homes. The school was "adopted" by the Los Angeles Dodgers in 1980, and it was known for sending the student choir to Dodger Stadium to sing the National Anthem before a ballgame. It is a Solano tradition to hold culmination ceremonies at Dodger Stadium. The class of 2001, however, did not have this privilege.

Park

It is also the city's oldest park, founded in 1886 by the Elysian Park Enabling Ordinance. It hosted shooting as well as the shooting part of the modern pentathlon event for the 1932 Summer Olympics.

In 1968, it hosted a hippie "Love-in."

Figueroa Street Tunnels

The Figueroa Street Tunnels take northbound State Route 110 (the Pasadena Freeway) through the park.

Solano Canyon

Solano Canyon is a canyon within Elysian Park and also the name of a residential district at the southern extremity of the Elysian Park neighborhood, directly north of the Los Angeles State Historic Park. The district is bisected near its southern tip by the Arroyo Seco Parkway, and it shares a border with Chinatown (Los Angeles).

Solano Canyon was also an old name for a ravine in the Hollywood Hills that was later named Runyon Canyon.

See also
 Elysian Park Fault, an earthquake-producing fault named after the park
 Ned R. Healy, L.A. City Council member (1943–44) and member of Congress (1945–47), opposed slant oil drilling under the park
 List of districts and neighborhoods of Los Angeles
 List of parks in Los Angeles

References

External links
History of Elysian Park
 Elysian Park neighborhood crime map and statistics]
  SolanoCanyon.org
 Solano Canyon can be seen on the horizon of this 1873 photograph, labeled No. 50, as published in "The Story of Fifty Years: Where the City: In Which Southern California and the Los Angeles Times Grew Up Together," Los Angeles Times, December 4, 1931, page E-3.

 
Parks in Los Angeles
Neighborhoods in Los Angeles
Central Los Angeles
Northwest Los Angeles
Municipal parks in California
Santa Monica Mountains
Populated places in the Santa Monica Mountains
Venues of the 1932 Summer Olympics
Olympic modern pentathlon venues
Olympic shooting venues
1886 establishments in California